Ping Shuai Gong is a hand-swinging, yangsheng/nourishment of life exercise pioneered by Taiwan Qigong (氣功) master Li Feng-shan  (李鳳山).

History 
The pioneer of Pingshuai is Taiwanese Qigong master Li Fengshan.

Benefits 
Pingshuai is simple. It has health-giving properties. Daily Pingshuai is claimed to enhance immune system, improves balance, makes joints and muscles more flexible, fortifies muscles, joints and bones, enhances blood and Qi circulation, replenishes energy, relaxes, calms and clears the mind, and sharpens senses. Pingshuai has been claimed to cure/alleviate many ailments, including insomnia, constipation, back pain, soreness and numbness of the legs or feet, arthritis and even cancer. 

Researchers observed brain waves during Pingshuai exercise. They reported that alpha waves gradually activated. In alpha state stress levels and anxiety decline, depression lifts and memory and creative thinking improve.

Li claimed that humans are energy, and internal energy is connected with external energy. He teaches that by self-control allows practioners to better cope with the outside world.

Practice 
Standing with legs at shoulder width, both arms move in parallel, swinging forward up to shoulder height, then swinging back until hey are behind the body. On every fifth swing, the knee slightly bends and quickly springs back.

Li recommends 3 daily periods of exercise for at least 10 minutes each time. Avoid drinking cold water immediately after the exercise.

References

External links
 TCM Ping Shuai Gong (Swing Hands Exercise) 平甩功
 Ping Shuai Gong_Meimen 2011 USA Qiqong Science
 Ping Shuai Episode 1 (English subtitles) 平甩傳愛第1集分享 英文字幕
 Ping Shuai Gong_Meimen 2011 U S A Qiqong Science

Physical exercise